"Walking Away" is a 1988 song by American synth-pop group, Information Society. Released as a single in late 1988, the song peaked at No. 9 in the United States in February 1989, No. 5 in the Hot Dance Club Play chart and No. 15 on the Modern Rock Tracks chart. "Walking Away" is the second single from the band's eponymous album. The music video was directed by Mark Pellington.

The song contains samples of William Shatner as James T. Kirk saying "It is useless to resist us" from the Star Trek episode, "Mirror, Mirror", and James Doohan as Scotty saying "Let's Go See!" from the Star Trek episode, "Wolf in the Fold".

Background
Singer Paul Robb said,

Track listings

EP
 "Walking Away" (S.M.D. Mix) – 7:09
 "Walking Away" (House Dub) – 6:09
 "Walking Away" (Radio Version) – 3:59

12" single

CD single

Charts

References

1988 singles
Information Society (band) songs
1988 songs
Tommy Boy Records singles